Tollywood films of the 1990s may refer to:
Bengali films of the 1990s
Telugu films of the 1990s